Probergrothius angolensis, sometimes known as the Welwitschia bug, is a species of true bug found in the Namib desert and nearby regions.

Relationship with Welwitschia

They are best known for their association with the unusual plant Welwitschia mirabilis, also endemic to the area, but it is in doubt whether they actually serve a role in pollination or only drink Welwitschia sap. In addition, they may spread a fungus, Aspergillus niger, in the process, which is harmful to developing seeds.

Comparison with Probergrothius sexpunctatus
The species has been recognized under a misattributed name, Probergrothius sexpunctatus, for several decades, but P. sexpunctatus is a separate species that occurs farther to the north. P. angolensis is yellowish with four black markings on its wings, while P. sexpunctatus is more reddish, and the anterior spots are separate, so the wings have six black markings.

References

External links

 Encyclopedia of Life entry
 iNaturalist entry
 iSpot entry

Insects described in 1902
Pyrrhocoridae